Deborah Joanne Wurzburger (born December 12, 1969) is a former competitive swimmer who represented Canada at the 1988 Summer Olympics in Seoul, South Korea.  She competed in first round heats of the women's 800-metre freestyle, finished ninth overall, and narrowly missed advancing to the event final.

References

External links
 
 
 

1969 births
Living people
Canadian female freestyle swimmers
Olympic swimmers of Canada
Sportspeople from Burlington, Ontario
Swimmers at the 1988 Summer Olympics